HMS Wizard was a W-class destroyer of the British Royal Navy that saw service during World War II.

Second World War service
In 1942, as part of Warship Week, Wizard was adopted by the Borough of Wood Green in London. The plaque from this adoption is held by the National Museum of the Royal Navy in Portsmouth.

These duties continued until 9 June 1944, when she sustained major damage from an explosion of her own depth charges, which caused considerable compartment flooding. The ship was towed to Lyness on the following day for emergency dry dock repair, later being towed to Middlesbrough for further repairs which lasted until April 1945. Over this period Wizard was reassigned for deployment to the British Pacific Fleet. After a period of sea-trials and preparation, it made passage to the Pacific, with a final resupply in Sydney, before joining the 27th Destroyer Flotilla in August. Although arriving in theatre before the end of the war, and being listed as part of the British Pacific Fleet present in Tokyo Bay when the surrender was signed on 2 September 1945, Wizard did not receive a Battle Honour as she had not been deployed operationally during the short time she was with the flotilla.

Post War service
From 1946 until 1951 Wizard served in the Plymouth local flotilla. During 1953 and 1954 she was converted at Devonport Dockyard into a Type 15 fast anti-submarine frigate, with the new pennant number F72.

In 1956 Wizard was part of the 5th Frigate Squadron and was deployed to the eastern Mediterranean as part of the Royal Navy force which took part in the Suez Crisis. On return to UK in May 1957 the frigate refitted at Chatham before joining the Dartmouth Training Squadron for two years before being deployed in the West Indies with the 8th Frigate Squadron until 1964. On return she resumed Cadet training and remained with the Dartmouth Squadron until 1966.

Decommissioning and disposal
In 1966 she was paid-off and was reduced to Reserve status. She was then placed on the Disposal List and sold to Thos. W. Ward for demolition on 16 February 1967. Taken in tow to Inverkeithing she arrived at the breaker's yard on 7 March that year.

Commanding officers

References

Publications
 
 
 

 

W and Z-class destroyers
1943 ships
World War II destroyers of the United Kingdom
Cold War destroyers of the United Kingdom
Type 15 frigates of the Royal Navy
Cold War frigates of the United Kingdom